The Superman Revenge Squad is the name of two fictional organizations in the DC Comics universe. As their name suggests, it is a group of Superman villains who banded together to defeat the Man of Steel.

Pre-Crisis on Infinite Earths
In Pre-Crisis continuity, the Squad originated as the Superboy Revenge Squad, debuting in Superboy #94 (January 1962); the Superman Revenge Squad subsequently appeared in Action Comics #286 (March 1962). Both Squads are composed of aliens from the planet Wexr II, whom Superboy had prevented from achieving galactic conquest. The Squad later grows to include members from other planets, all of whom are sworn enemies of Superman.

Many of the Squad's plans to destroy Superman use psychological warfare, including red kryptonite-induced nightmares, hypnotising Superman into committing destructive acts, and tricking Superman into revealing his secret identity. They transferred the intelligence of a Superman robot into a super-powered body, making him Wonder Man, and hoping he would destroy Superman with some kryptonite that he was given and to which he was invulnerable. He later realized their plot and, with Superman, threw the ship with such force it would take years for the two members to break free, but Wonder Man then told Superman that his body would soon die. Once they lured Superman into following them to 1,000,000 AD, where he lost his powers and was trapped on the Earth, due to the Sun having turned red by then. He used a miniature Kandorian rocket left in his Fortress of Solitude, after shrinking himself with red kryptonite, to travel back to his own time. They appeared briefly in the first Superman Red/Superman Blue (July 1963) storyline, they were about to attack the Earth after teaming up with Brainiac, but, in that moment, the anti-evil rays Superman developed struck them and they reformed.

In their earliest appearances the Squad members appeared hooded in order to keep their identities a secret. Later versions of the Squad wore modified versions of Superman's costume, with the S-shield made of kryptonite and their heads shaved bald in tribute to Lex Luthor.

In one of their appearances during Crisis, in DC Comics Presents #87 (November 1985), the Squad sends Superman into a parallel universe, where he meets Superboy-Prime, the sole superhero of Earth-Prime.

Although Revenge Squad members went nameless in several stories, those who were identified include leader Rava and Scout 627 (Action Comics #287); Dixo and Vagu (Action Comics #295); Dorx and Krit (Action Comics #380); Dramx-One, Fwom, Jumrox, Klakok, Nryana (Superman #366); Nakox (Superman #367); and Tydru (Superman #368).

Post-Crisis on Infinite Earths
In Adventures of Superman #543 (February 1997), a new version of the Revenge Squad is introduced. The new Squad is established by Morgan Edge, who assembles various characters with a grudge against Superman and attempts to frame Lex Luthor as their leader.

Members include:
Morgan Edge
Maxima
Barrage
Riot
Misa
Anomaly

In Action Comics #736 (August 1997), Edge assembles another version of the team, with the same purposes.

Members include:
Morgan Edge
Baud
Barrage (only returning field member)
Parasite
Rock

Post-Infinite Crisis, Lex Luthor constructs a new team as part of the "Superman: Last Son" storyline. Superman himself joins the team to fight against General Zod's army of evil Kryptonians.

Members include:
Metallo, now armed with several kinds of Kryptonite, including gold.
Parasite
Superman
Lex Luthor
Bizarro

DC Rebirth 
Following 2016's Superman Reborn events, a new Superman Revenge Squadron appeared after restructuring the reality introduced in 2011's The New 52, being recruited by a restored Eradicator and Hank Henshaw who regained his status as Cyborg Superman, of which it is formed as follows:

Provisional Members:
 Blanque
 Metallo
 Hank Henshaw (Cyborg Superman I)
 Eradicator II
 Mongul (starting with Action Comics #978)
 General Zod

References in other comics
A Batman Revenge Squad appeared in World's Finest Comics #175 (May 1968) with Cash Carew, Barney the Blast, and the Flamethrower dressed in similar costumes to Batman with purple in place of gray and their symbol was a skull with bat wings.

When Guy Gardner fought the Eradicator after Superman's death, he calls himself a "One-Man Superman Revenge Squad".Spider-Man Revenge Squad is the name of a group that appeared in the first volume of The Spectacular Spider-Man (1976), being formed by some of the less known villains of the hero, such as: The Spot, The Kangoroo, The Gibbon and The Grizzly, they were mocked several time throughout the story with Spider-Man himself calling them The All-Losers Squad.

A group of Ambush Bug fans who wanted him destroyed were known as the Ambush Bug Revenge Squad.

A group of villains including Shrapnel, Gizmo, Magenta, Girder, the Thinker, and Cyborgirl were known as the Cyborg Revenge Squad' formed by Mr. Elias Orr and Titans Tomorrow's Cyborg 2.0.

In other media
 A variation of the Superman Revenge Squad appears in the Justice League two-part episode "Hereafter", consisting of Metallo, Kalibak, Livewire, Weather Wizard, and Toyman. After the other members are defeated by the Justice League, Toyman blasts Superman with an enormous energy cannon, apparently killing him. It is later discovered that Superman had been sent 30,000 years into the future before eventually returning home with help from a repentant Vandal Savage.
 A variation of the Superman Revenge Squad appears in Superman 64'', consisting of Lex Luthor, Darkseid, Parasite, Brainiac, Metallo, and Mala.
 The Superman Revenge Squad's name was adopted by Nosferatu D2 frontman Ben Parker for his solo recordings.

Footnotes

External links
  Supermanica entry on the pre-Crisis Superman Revenge Squad
  another good entry from supermanhomepage

Comics characters introduced in 1962
DC Comics supervillain teams